Ewell "Turkey" Gross (February 21, 1896 – January 11, 1936) was a shortstop in Major League Baseball who played briefly for the Boston Red Sox during the 1925 season. Ewell "Turkey" Gross once completed an unassisted triple play at third base. He caught the hit, tagged the man coming from second base, and got the man headed for home plate as he attempted to scramble back to third base. 

The son of Alfred and Mary Gross, Ewell played for several seasons in the Texas League during the 1920s and later served as manager of the Dallas Steers, Paris (Texas) Colts and Kilgore Gushers.

He died of a kidney infection in 1936 and is buried in Mesquite Cemetery.

See also
Boston Red Sox all-time roster
List of baseball nicknames

References

External links

Boston Red Sox players
Major League Baseball shortstops
Baseball players from Texas
1896 births
1936 deaths